Elections to North Down Borough Council were held on 15 May 1985 on the same day as the other Northern Irish local government elections. The election used four district electoral areas to elect a total of 24 councillors.

Election results

Note: "Votes" are the first preference votes.

Districts summary

|- class="unsortable" align="centre"
!rowspan=2 align="left"|Ward
! % 
!Cllrs
! %
!Cllrs
! %
!Cllrs
! %
!Cllrs
! %
!Cllrs
!rowspan=2|TotalCllrs
|- class="unsortable" align="center"
!colspan=2 bgcolor="" | UUP
!colspan=2 bgcolor="" | Alliance
!colspan=2 bgcolor="" | DUP
!colspan=2 bgcolor="" | UPUP
!colspan=2 bgcolor="white"| Others
|-
|align="left"|Abbey
|28.2
|2
|17.2
|1
|bgcolor="#D46A4C"|36.3
|bgcolor="#D46A4C"|2
|16.3
|1
|2.0
|0
|6
|-
|align="left"|	Ballyholme and Groomsport
|bgcolor="40BFF5"|36.8
|bgcolor="40BFF5"|2
|28.5
|2
|22.8
|2
|7.8
|1
|4.1
|0
|6
|-
|align="left"|Bangor West
|bgcolor="40BFF5"|28.5
|bgcolor="40BFF5"|2
|27.7
|2
|19.8
|1
|9.3
|0
|9.6
|1
|7
|-
|align="left"|Holywood
|bgcolor="40BFF5"|35.1
|bgcolor="40BFF5"|2
|30.5
|2
|15.7
|1
|6.5
|0
|12.2
|0
|5
|- class="unsortable" class="sortbottom" style="background:#C9C9C9"
|align="left"| Total
|32.3
|8
|26.3
|7
|23.3
|6
|9.7
|2
|8.4
|0
|24
|-
|}

District results

Abbey

1985: 2 x DUP, 2 x UUP, 1 x Alliance, 1 x UPUP

Ballyholme and Groomsport

1985: 2 x UUP, 2 x Alliance, 1 x DUP, 1 x Independent Unionist

Bangor West

1985: 2 x UUP, 2 x Alliance, 2 x DUP, 1 x UPUP

Holywood

1985: 2 x UUP, 2 x Alliance, 1 x DUP

References

North Down Borough Council elections
North Down